West Vancouver Schools, also known as WVS or School District 45 West Vancouver, is a school district in British Columbia. It is immediately north of Vancouver and includes the Municipality of West Vancouver, the community of Lions Bay and Bowen Island.

Schools

See also
List of school districts in British Columbia

References

External links
 District Review - Ministry of Education

International Baccalaureate schools in British Columbia
West Vancouver
V